The 2006 Mnet KM Music Festival (MKMF) was the eighth of the annual music awards in Seoul, South Korea that took place on November 25, 2006, at the Olympic Gymnastics Arena.

Leading the nominees were boy bands TVXQ and SG Wannabe, and solo artist Rain with five nominations each. The boy bands secured two wins each by the end of the ceremony, while the latter received only one award out of 5 nominations.

Background
The award ceremony was held for the eighth consecutive time. Starting this year, however, three grand prizes (or daesang) were introduced including Artist of the Year, Song of the Year, and Album of the Year awards. The event took place at the Olympic Gymnastics Arena once again with Shin Dong-yup as a returning host and Kim Ok-bin as his co-host.

Criteria
The following criteria for winners include:

Winners and nominees
Winners are listed first and highlighted in boldface.

Special awards
 Digital Popularity Award: SG Wannabe – "Partner for Life"
 YEPP Netizen Popularity Award: Shinhwa – "Once in a Lifetime"
 Creative Sector
 Composition Award: Jo Young Su (조영수) – "Partner for Life" (by SG Wannabe)
 Lyrics Award: Ahn Young-Min (안영민) – "Crazy Love Song" (by SeeYa)
 Arrangement Award: Ryu Jae Hyun (류재현) – "The Man The Woman" (by Vibe)
 Mnet.com Award: TVXQ – "'O'-Jung.Ban.Hap."
 Overseas Viewers' Award: Shinhwa – "Once In A Lifetime"
 Mnet Plus Mobile Popularity Award: TVXQ – "'O'-Jung.Ban.Hap."
 Best Asia Pop Artist: W-inds

Multiple awards

Artist(s) with multiple wins
The following artist(s) received two or more wins (excluding the special awards):

Artist(s) with multiple nominations
The following artist(s) received more than two nominations:

Performers and presenters
The following individuals and groups, listed in order of appearance, presented awards or performed musical numbers.

Performers

Presenters

References

External links
 Mnet Asian Music Awards official website
  

MAMA Awards ceremonies
Mnet Km Music Festival
Mnet Km Music Festival
Mnet Km Music Festival
Mnet Music Video Festival, 2006